UCM may refer to:

Educational institutions 
 University College Isle of Man, primary centre for tertiary, vocational education and higher education on the Isle of Man.
 University College Maastricht, a liberal arts and sciences college in Maastricht, the Netherlands and part of Maastricht University
 University of California, Merced, a campus in the San Joaquin Valley, California, United States
 University of Central Missouri, a public institution in Warrensburg, Missouri, United States
 Complutense University of Madrid, a university in Madrid, Spain
 Catholic University of Madagascar, a university in Antananarivo, Madagascar
 Catholic University of Mozambique, a university with campuses throughout central and northern Mozambique
 Catholic University of the Maule (Universidad Católica del Maule), a university in Chile
 Kazimierz Wielki University in Bydgoszcz (Universitas Casimiri Magni), a university in Bydgoszcz, Poland

Other uses 
 Uniform Circular Motion, the motion of a body traversing a circular path at constant speed
 Unresolved complex mixture, a feature observed in gas chromatographic data
 Universal Content Management, a software forming part of Oracle Fusion Middleware
 Upper Convected Maxwell model, a rheological model for polymer liquids
 Uniunea Civică Maghiară, one of several political parties, see Hungarian Civic Alliance (disambiguation)
 Uttarakhand Council of Ministers, the state government cabinet of Uttarakhand, India
 Universal Communication Module, a hardware device for unified communication in the networks, i.e Enapter IIoT UCM